Telluride is a ghost town in Lander County, state of Nevada in the United States.

History
In 1875 or 1876, the Battle Mountain Mining Company built a 30-ton concentrator nearby at the mouth of Willow Creek to serve the mines of Copper Canyon.  The concentrator closed in 1876.

Due to heavy snows, the find was not made public until the spring of 1911. The camp was named in 1911. Although at the site there were the stores of several business and a saloon, the problem was the difficulty of access prevented further development for Telluride. The mine was closed in 1912 and people had abandoned the site. There were recent mining activity in the area and the only remains of the old site are scant ruins.

References

Ghost towns in Lander County, Nevada
Mining communities in Nevada
Gold mining in Nevada
Populated places established in 1875